Patagornis is a genus of extinct flightless predatory birds of the family Phorusrhacidae. Known as "terror birds", these lived in what is now Argentina during the Early and Middle Miocene; the Santa Cruz Formation in Patagonia contains numerous specimens. Patagornis was an agile, medium sized Patagornithine and was likely a pursuit predator.

Etymology 
The genus name means "bird from Patagonia" after the location the fossils were found in and the species name after prominent American paleontologist Othniel Charles Marsh, who had also named notable fossil birds but from the American West like Hesperornis and Ichthyornis.

Recently, Federico Agnolin has promoted reusing Florentino Ameghino’s 1891 name Tolmodus inflatus because the name Patagornis marshi wasn’t used for over 100 years until a paper by Alvarenga & Höfling in 2003. This would make the name Patagornis marshi a nomen nudum and Tolmodus inflatus the valid name due to its frequent use. Despite this, the use of the Patagornis marshi has had a great resurgence in use in recent years and the proper nomenclature hasn't been established by the ICZN. The generic name Tolmodus means "bold tooth" due to the misinterpretation of the holotype premaxilla as the tooth of a mammal, while the species name means "inflated" due to its large size.

History and taxonomy 
In 1891 during the "Argentine Bone Wars", a competition between Argentine paleontologists Francisco Moreno and Florentino Ameghino, the former and his colleague Alcides Mercerart described a new genus and species of phorusrhacid, Patagornis marshi, based on a mandibular symphysis that was missing the tip, though it was then thought to be a piece of the premaxilla. The fossil (MLP-143) was found alongside many other parts of a skeleton, likely from the same individual as the symphysis, including: 3 vertebrae and fragments of many others, parts of the hindlimbs, and ungues. The specific locality where these fossils were found isn't known in detail, besides that they came from the upper middle Miocene strata of the Santa Cruz Formation of Santa Cruz, Argentina. In the same paper, Moreno and Mercerat named 2 more species of Patagornis, Patagornis lemoinei and Patagornis bachmanni, based on fossils found in the Monte León Formation, Argentina in lower Miocene strata. They also named Palaeociconia cristata based on 2 vertebrae and 2 ungues from Santa Cruz, believing that they were from a fossil stork related to Ciconia. In 1933, biologist Karl Lambert placed P. cristata in its own genus, Morenomerceraria, but the genus name has since no use since. Palaeociconia cristata has since been synonymized with Patagornis marshi. P. lemoinei and P. bachmanni are now species of Psilopterus. 

Moreno's rival, Ameghino, also unknowingly found or described many fossils of Patagornis marshi from the Miocene deposits in Santa Cruz, many of the fossils being collected by Ameghino's brother Carlos Ameghino. In August 1891, Ameghino named Tolmodus inflatus based on a fragment of the right premaxilla that had been collected by Carlos in the same middle Miocene deposits in Santa Cruz. Ameghino originally considered the taxon an edentate mammal related to Phorusrhacos, but 2 months later in June he synonymized the two and realized that they were actually flightless carnivorous birds, a conclusion made earlier by Moreno. Ameghino over several years amassed many Patagornis fossils, many of which were described in his 1895 monograph on Patagonian fossil birds. The most complete skeleton (BMNH-A516) includes a complete skull and mandible, one of the first complete Phorusrhacid skulls known, and many limb elements as well as a complete pelvis. Another synonym of Patagornis marshi was named by Ameghino in 1895, Phororhacos modicus, based on a humerus and tarsometatarsus from Santa Cruz and another mistakenly assigned fossil was a premaxilla wrongfully assigned by Ameghino to the rhea Opisthodactylus. Ameghino also believed that the fossils came from the Cretaceous and Eocene "Pyrotherium Beds", when they actually were of Miocene age. By the end of the "Argentine Bone Wars", many Patagornis fossils had been collected and majority reside in the Museo de la Plata or the Natural History Museum, London.

Several fragmentary Patagornis specimens were also collected by American crews from Princeton University and the Field Museum of Natural History in Princeton, New Jersey and Chicago, Illinois respectively, although the fossils found by the former now reside at the American Museum of Natural History in New York. The Museo de la Plata also collected a nearly complete Patagornis skeleton, including a skull, though it is poorly preserved.

Description and paleobiology 
Patagornis was very similar to Andalgalornis, another member of the subfamily Patagornithinae, in size and weight, however Andalgalornis was slightly larger. The diameter of the leg bones was about 15% larger than in the living rhea. However, the back height was about the same at 90–100 cm. Estimates of the weight vary: 45 to 50 kg or only 23 kg. The walking speed of birds is determined by the ratio of the two leg bones tibiotarsus and tarsometatarsus and by their strength. At Patagornis this ratio is almost 70%, meaning that the taxon was very agile, a trait common among the smaller Patagornithines. Research from 2005 therefore showed that the animal had a maximum speed of 50 km/h, about the same speed as the living rhea. The anterior margin of the fenestra antorbitalis of Patagornis is moderately sloped, while at Andrewsornis it is strongly sloping and at Andalgalornis only slightly sloping. Alvarenga & Hofling describe the dorsal portion of the nostrils as "very conspicuous". The symphysis mandibulae is slightly curved, with the apex of the beak end uncurved.

On the best preserved Patagornis skeleton, BMNH-A516, the ulna preserved large quill knobs on the posterior end that suggest large wing feathers. These feathers were theorized to have been used for assistance in running, as implied by its ecology and limb anatomy, or as a shield like on the extant Secretary bird. The former theory is much more likely based on the anatomy of the quill knobs themselves and their presence in the related Llallawavis which has a similar agile anatomy. The ungual phalanges preserved in Patagornis and its distant relative Mesembriornis are large, curved, and thin laterally, likely being used to stab prey based on those of modern predatory birds.

Ear anatomy 
In 2015 during their study on the ear anatomy of phorusrhacids, Degrange et al also studied the internal ear anatomy preserved in Llallawavis, Patagornis, & several modern birds. They discovered that the hearing of Patagornis was very poor & had the smallest hearing range in the Cariamiformes studied. The semicircular canals of Llallawavis were much more elongated compared to the short canals of Patagornis, and with the greater body mass, it was inferred that there were more sluggish head movements in this taxon, with enhanced sensitivity to low-amplitude motions.

Classification 
Due to the great preservation of Patagornis and its relatives, comparisons with other taxa and detailed classification are much easier compared to other phorusrhacids. In 2003 during their redescription of phorusrhacidae, Herculano Alvarenga and Elizabeth Hofling created a new subfamily, Patagornithinae, with Patagornis as the type genus. Patagornis is similar to its relatives Andrewsornis and Andalgalornis in that they all are medium-sized phorusrhacids with slender, lightly built bodies, long and narrow mandibular symphyses, and long and slender tibiotarsi and tarsometatarsi. However, a phylogenetic analysis in 2015 by Degrange et al found Patagornis in a merged Phorusrhacinae and in polytomy with Physornis and Phorusrhacos as well. 

The following phylogenetic tree shows the internal relationships of Phorusrhacidae under the exclusion of Brontornis as published by Degrange and colleagues in 2015, which recovers Patagornis as a member of a large clade that includes Physornis, Phorusrhacos and Andalgalornis, among others.

Paleoenvironment 
Patagornis lived during the middle Miocene in the Santa Cruz Formation, which preserves mostly a coastal environment, but also forested and grassland regions. The area had little rainfall, so forests developed around lakes and rivers, giving Santa Cruz a diverse environment. During the Miocene, the climate was similar to those of the coasts of Chile with semi-temperate forests and oceanic winds. Grasslands began spreading into Argentina during the Miocene, though much of inner Patagonia was still arid with small rainforests in between. Large, herbivorous, South American notoungulate mammals like the Toxodonts Nesodon and Adinotherium were the large low browsers, with rabbit-like Interathere Protypotherium being frugivorous. Both mammalian and avian carnivores inhabited the area, the largest being the Phorusrhacid Phorusrhacos. Marsupials also lived in the region, including the large carnivorous Sparassodont Borhyaena. Patagornis is also known from the coastal Monte Leon Formation that was in the same region in Santa Cruz, but part of the older lower Miocene age. Monte Leon preserved more mudstone and estuarine sediments, but with a very similar fauna to the Santa Cruz Formation as the two formations had a direct transition.

References

External links 
 Genus Taxonomy

Phorusrhacidae
Extinct flightless birds
Miocene birds of South America
Laventan
Colloncuran
Friasian
Santacrucian
Neogene Argentina
Fossils of Argentina
Fossil taxa described in 1891